K-Town may refer to:
K-Town, a nickname for Kearny, New Jersey
K-Town, a nickname for Kristiansand, Norway
K-Town, a nickname for Kuwait, a middle eastern country
K-Town, a shortened term for Koreatown, an ethnic enclave
Koreatown, Los Angeles
Koreatown, Manhattan
Koreatown, Palisades Park, New Jersey, United States
Koreatown, Toronto, Canada
Koreatown, Queens, New York City
K-Town, Chicago, a neighborhood in North Lawndale, Illinois, United States
K-Town Historic District
"K-Town" (LEXX episode), an episode of the science fiction TV series LEXX
K-Town (web series), an American reality television series
Billboard K-Town, an online magazine column

Places nicknamed K-Town

Kearny, New Jersey
Keighley
Kaiserslautern, Germany: a city close to Ramstein Air Base; Kaiserslautern is a long name and sometimes difficult to pronounce for non-German speakers, therefore the abbreviation
Kaiserslautern Military Community
Kelowna, British Columbia, Canada
Kenosha, Wisconsin, United States
Knoxville, Tennessee, United States
Kodambakkam, Chennai, also known as Kollywood
Karachi, Pakistan
Kingston, Ontario, Canada 
Kaysville, Utah, United States

Komarken , Kungälv, Sweden